The Kinburn Spit is a spit in Mykolaiv Raion, Mykolaiv Oblast, Ukraine. Its only land access is through Kherson Oblast. It occupies the westernmost part of the Kinburn Peninsula, stretching west into the Black Sea between the Dnieper-Bug estuary to the north and the Yahorlyk Bay to the south.

During the 2022 Russian invasion of Ukraine, the spit became a Ukrainian holdout, and was taken by Russian forces on 10 June, almost four months after the war began. Russia fortified the spit and used it as a site to deploy electronic warfare and coordinate missile and artillery attacks on nearby Ukrainian positions. Since the Russian retreat from the west bank of the Dnieper river during the 2022 Ukrainian southern counteroffensive on 11 November, recaptured territory from above the spit has allowed Ukrainian forces to more frequently attempt amphibious landings on the spit to conduct reconnaissance for its potential recapture. On 8 January 2023, Ukrainian officials confirmed that the spit is still occupied by Russian forces, but that military operations and shelling on the spit are continuing under operational silence.

History

Pre-2022 

Until the mid-19th century, an Ottoman fort was located on Kinburn Spit, which was taken over by Russians at the end of the 18th century. It was dismantled following the 1853-1856 Crimean War under the terms of the Treaty of Paris (1856). During the control of the Soviet Union from 1922-1991, the entire Kinburn Peninsula had a population of more than 1,000 in the three villages located there, and was known for its strawberry growing and harvesting. The harvested crop would often be flown to Odesa for wider distribution in farmers' markets. Approximately after the fall of the Soviet Union in 1991, the population in all three villages dropped, and as of 2022 stood at around 150 combined; the majority of the strawberry growing and harvesting stopped. This has led to Kinburn becoming a Natural Park in Ukraine, preserving the remaining ecosystem and wildlife, specifically the unique pink pelicans which live there. The majority of the revenue from the spit before the invasion came from campers, hikers, and stargazers visiting the National Park.

2022 Russian invasion 
The Kinburn Spit was not occupied by Russian forces at the beginning of the 2022 Russian invasion of Ukraine. Four months later on 10 June Russian forces took the spit after overcoming resistance by Ukrainian forces there. The Russian offensive was aided in part by the consistent bombardment of Ukrainian naval assets in Ochakiv in the month leading to the capture, making it difficult for Ukraine to resupply its troops there. The capture of the spit was one of the last significant Russian military victories on the southern Ukrainian front in 2022.

During the occupation, Russian forces deployed electronic warfare systems and coordinated shelling of the right bank of the Dnieper and southern Ukraine. The spit was also used as a launch site for missile and artillery attacks on Ukrainian-controlled positions in Ochakiv, southern Mykolaiv Oblast, and the Black Sea coast. The spit housed at least one ammunition depot and potentially a combat drone control and training center. The spit was believed to be well-fortified by Russia with square concrete bunkers.

Ukrainian recapture attempts

September-October 2022 
In April 2022, the United Kingdom advised Ukrainian forces on the ground to "conduct beach reconnaissance" and locate "good landing locations" on the spit in the case of a future counterattack. It is unclear whether any reconnaissance followed. The first recorded reconnoiter came in September by the special forces of Ukraine in rigid inflatable boats. On 14 September, the first Ukrainian amphibious landing was attempted, which ultimately was not successful. On the day following the attempted landing, Deputy Head of the Kherson Military-Civilian Administration Kirill Stremousov claimed that over 120 Ukrainian servicemen had been killed in the attack. The landing was never acknowledged by Ukraine, leading to differing accounts from different sources detailing the attack. Ukrainian assaults continued, including a successful strike on a Russian equipment grouping on 19 September, and on an ammunition depot on 26 September, which may have been a combat drone control and training center. An unconfirmed report on the attack claimed that the strikes killed four dozen Russian soldiers and two dozen Iranian trainers instructing the Russians on how to use the drones. 

In October, the Ukrainian Navy's last big ship, Yuri Olefirenko, was seen firing rockets at Russian forces on or near the spit, and on 25 October, another ammunition depot was destroyed.

November- 
After the Russian retreat from the west bank of the Dnieper river during the Ukrainian southern counteroffensive on 11 November, all remaining Russian-occupied territory in Mykolaiv Oblast except Kinburn Spit was recaptured by Ukrainian forces. Ukraine once again had access to the mouth of the Dnieper, although navigation to the Black Sea was still not possible. Ochakiv became less vulnerable to Russian artillery attacks after the frontline shift, allowing Ukrainian forces to stage attacks from there with less threat of disruption. On 12 November, Ukraine's Operational Command South officially announced their intention to recapture Kinburn Spit.

On the night of 13 November, Ukrainian landing groups from Ochakiv attempted to land on the spit at Pokrovske after conducting limited raids and small boat landings in the days before. After a short battle, the landing group was destroyed. Reports the operation had been a success circulated on mainly Ukrainian social networks until the rebuff was officially clarified by the Armed Forces of Ukraine on 15 November. On 14 November, Russian forces launched S-300 missiles at Ochakiv, which they reported was to disrupt Ukrainian fire control over the spit, delaying future attempts at a landing. On 16 November, Ukraine's Operational Command South reported that its forces had carried out more than 50 strikes around the spit to disrupt Russian shelling and electronic warfare. The strikes reportedly killed 17 Russian troops and damaged 18 pieces of military equipment. On 18 and 19 November, Ukrainian attacks reportedly continued, successfully targeting concentrations of Russian forces and equipment. On 21 November, Ukrainian head of the press center of the Security and Defense Forces of the Operational Command South Nataliya Gumenyuk,officially confirmed that Ukraine was conducting military operations on the spit, but called for operational silence, which was confirmed a day later by the CSCIS who said that Ukrainian forces had yet to officially recapture ground. The new information promoted the following response from the ISW,  Despite this advantage in fortification, it was reported by Nataliya Gumenyuk during a telethon on 28 November that weather was playing a role in complicating Ukrainian military operations. The same day, Russian forces deported the last remaining 37 residents from the already sparsely populated area, as military operations continued there. On 1 and 7 December, it was again acknowledged by Ukrainian and Russian officials that military operations were still continuing, but that Ukraine had yet to officially retake any area. Volodymyr Saldo on 22 December, followed by another Russian source on 24 December, claimed that Ukrainian forces were regularly shelling the spit with long-range artillery and had destroyed a Russian port building there as a result, but that repeated assaults had been repelled. On 6 January 2023, a Russian milblogger claimed that Ukrainian reconnaissance activities were continuing, which was supported by a statement made by Nataliya Gumenyuk two days later.

Environmental impact 
The 2022 Russian Invasion of Ukraine not only had a disruptive and destructive impact on the residents who lived on the Kinburn Spit, but to the unique plants and wildlife such as the Сentaurea breviceps and Сentaurea Paczoskii cornflower species, and their sensitive ecosystem. Bombs, and the pollutants that came from them, killed nearby dolphins, and opened the sand and soil to the threat of chemicals seeping in and invasive species, according to the research and policy director at the UK-based Conflict and Environment Observatory Doug Weir. In May 2022 a 4,000 hectares (10,000 acres) fire, started by rockets, inflicted lasting habitat damage to the perennial forests and salt marshes of the spit.

Regional Landscape Park 

The Regional Landscape Park of Kinburn Foreland encompasses 17,890 hectares, of which 5,631 ha is covered with water.

Park purposes:
Conservation of biological and landscape diversity
Organized citizens' activity
Cultural and educational activities
Local needs

Responsibility for compliance with environmental legislation, planning and development of the territory are assigned to the park administration, which is located in Ochakiv.

Flora and fauna 
The Kinburn foreland is a unique natural complex of Lower-Dnieper sands consisting of mosaics of sandy steppes, various wetlands and artificial pine plantations. The protected weather contributes to a major vegetation area at the foreland in a combination of lush herbaceous vegetation with a pine and oak forest. Swamps can be found In the eastern part.

At the foreland a significant number of endemic, rare and endangered species of protected plants are observed. About 60 species found here appear in the Ukrainian Red List. More than 15 fauna species are endemic to the region. The Kinburn foreland is a part of the natural migration routes of many species of birds, where they concentrate, nest, and winter. Yagorlitsky Bay, with islands, forelands and inland lakes is considered a wetlands of international importance.

See also 
 Kinburn Peninsula
 Russian occupation of Mykolaiv Oblast

References

External links 

 Kinburn Spit at the Encyclopedia of Ukraine
 Description (Ukr.)
 Decision of getting a regional park status.
 Kinburn foreland park official web-page
 Kinburn foreland park publications

Ecosystems
Geography of Mykolaiv Oblast
Protected areas of Ukraine
Regional parks
Spits of the Black Sea
Spits of Ukraine